Boxing the Moonlight is the second studio album by Mister Heavenly. It was released on October 6, 2017 on the record label Polyvinyl Record Co. The album finds the trio "embrac[ing] a tougher sound" than on their debut Out of Love.

Track listing

References 

2017 albums
Albums with cover art by Robert Beatty (artist)
Mister Heavenly albums
Polyvinyl Record Co. albums